Ngaurukehu, Ngarukehu, or Ngaurakehu, was a flag station on the North Island Main Trunk line, in the Ruapehu District of New Zealand. It is in the Hautapu River valley. It now has three passing loops.

History 
The line through Ngaurukehu was built and equipped with a telegraph line by the Public Works Department (PWD) in 1906. It was transferred to NZR on 1 July 1908, but sidings north and south of the single track weren't opened until Thursday 1 July 1909. They were added to reduce delays caused by trains waiting to clear each other on the climb from Mataroa to Turangarere. Ngaurukehu was staffed by two tablet porters, with a signalbox and houses. 2 more state houses were built in 1955 and by 1957 the crossing loop had been extended, with motor points and colour light signals. Tenders for further extension of the loop were invited in 1973.

To the north of the station, the  Ngaurukehu, or Rabbit, tunnel, was prepared for electrification in 1984.

Incidents 

On 5 December 1923 a guard was injured when his van overturned after a goods train was reversed from the north siding, holding 46 wagons, into the south siding, which only had room for 41, the remainder falling off the end of the track. Some of the debris later fell onto a coach on an express train. In 1929 Cabinet approved extension of the south backshunt for £400.

Slips were a common problem. Between Hīhītahi and Ngaurukehu a slip derailed an engine in 1918, part of a goods train in 1923 and a large boulder overturned a locomotive and derailed nine wagons in 1940. Slips in the vicinity of the station delayed trains in 1912, 1926, 1929, 1930, 1935, 1940.

Scientific Reserve 
To the west of the railway  was taken on 20 August 1911 for Maungakaretu (now Ngaurukehu) Scientific Reserve, which protects several plants, including the rare Small-leaved Tree Daisy, Olearia gardneri. It is threatened by broom, Cytisus scoparius, and Khasia berry, Cotoneaster simonsii, which are common in the area. The 1907 recommendation was for protection of a rather larger area.

References

External links 
Photos -

 a coach damaged on 6 December 1923
 passing loops about 1988

Railway stations in New Zealand
Rail transport in Manawatū-Whanganui
Buildings and structures in Manawatū-Whanganui
Railway stations closed in 1982
Railway stations opened in 1909
Rangitikei District